Carolyne Adalla is a Kenyan writer, author of Confessions of an AIDS victim (1993).

Carolyne Adalla was born in Kenya. Confessions of an AIDS victim is a short epistolatory novel. The protagonist Catherine Njeri discovers that she has AIDS and cannot continue with her plans to study in the United States.

Works
 Confessions of an AIDS victim. Nairobi: East Africa Educational Publishers, 1993.

References

Year of birth missing (living people)
Living people
Kenyan novelists
Kenyan women writers